Douai Mountain is a mountain  on the border of Alberta and British Columbia, named in 1918 after Douai, a village in France liberated by Canadians and allies in World War I.

See also
 List of peaks on the British Columbia–Alberta border
 List of mountains in the Canadian Rockies

References

Three-thousanders of Alberta
Three-thousanders of British Columbia
Canadian Rockies